The red-billed woodcreeper (Hylexetastes perrotii) is a species of bird in the Dendrocolaptinae subfamily. It often includes the uniform and the Brigida's woodcreeper as subspecies.

It is found in Brazil, French Guiana, Guyana, Suriname, and Venezuela.
Its natural habitat is humid lowland forests.

References

red-billed woodcreeper
Birds of the Guianas
Birds of the Amazon Basin
red-billed woodcreeper
Taxonomy articles created by Polbot